Qadree Waymond Ollison (born September 8, 1996) is an American football running back for the Jacksonville Jaguars of the National Football League (NFL). He played college football at Pittsburgh and was drafted by the Atlanta Falcons in the fifth round of the 2019 NFL Draft.

Early years
Ollison attended and played high school football at Canisius High School in Buffalo, New York.

College career
Ollison attended and played college football at Pittsburgh.

Collegiate statistics

Professional career

Atlanta Falcons
Ollison was drafted by the Atlanta Falcons in the fifth round (152nd overall) of the 2019 NFL Draft. In the Week 11 matchup against the Carolina Panthers, Ollison scored from two yards out on his first career rushing attempt during the second quarter of the 29–3 win. During Week 12 against the Tampa Bay Buccaneers, Ollison scored his second career touchdown. As a rookie, he appeared in eight games and recorded 22 carries for 50 rushing yards and four rushing touchdowns.

On September 2, 2021, Ollison was waived by the Falcons and re-signed to the practice squad. He was promoted to the active roster on December 11. During the Week 18 matchup against the New Orleans Saints, he scored his fifth career touchdown on a 19-yard rushing attempt in the 30–20 loss.

On March 28, 2022, Ollison re-signed with the Falcons. He was waived on August 30.

Dallas Cowboys
On September 1, 2022, Ollison was signed to the Dallas Cowboys practice squad. The signing reunited him with defensive coordinator Dan Quinn, who was his head coach with the Falcons. His practice squad contract with the team expired after the season on January 22, 2023.

Jacksonville Jaguars
On February 13, 2023, Ollison signed a reserve/future contract with the Jacksonville Jaguars.

References

External links
Atlanta Falcons bio
Pittsburgh Panthers bio

1996 births
Living people
American football running backs
Atlanta Falcons players
Dallas Cowboys players
Jacksonville Jaguars players
Pittsburgh Panthers football players
Players of American football from New York (state)
Sportspeople from Niagara Falls, New York